Epiphloea is a genus of algae belonging to the family Halymeniaceae.

Species:

Epiphloea bullosa 
Epiphloea grandifolia 
Epiphloea harveyi

References

Florideophyceae
Red algae genera